Rodrigo de Ceballos (also Çavallos, Cevallos, Zaballos; c.1525-c.1581) was a Spanish composer.

He was born in Aracena (Huelva), and was ordained a priest in Seville in 1556. He was named maestro di cappella in Málaga in 1554, in the cathedral of Córdoba in 1556, and in Royal Chapel of Granada in 1561 until is death in 1581.

He is among the composers of the Andalusian school, alongside better-known composers such as Francisco Guerrero (who, with Pedro Fernández de Castilleja, gave him his holy orders) or Cristobal de Morales. His polyphonic works, preserved in various Spanish and Latin American cathedrals and monasteries, are often confused with those of Francisco de Ceballos, who was maestro at Burgos Cathedral from 1535 to his death in 1571.

Works
79 works of Rodrigo's are known to survive; these include 39 motets, three masses, eight psalms for Vespers, six hymns, eight settings of the Magnificat, a setting of Compline, and seven secular pieces.

Recordings
 Rodrigo de Ceballos – Lamentaciones Ensemble Gilles Binchois, dir Dominique Vellard. Alma Viva DS0136
Anthologies:
 Song of Songs Stile Antico (early music vocal ensemble)
 Canticum Canticorum: Spanish polyphonic settings from the Song of Songs Orchestra of the Renaissance dir Richard Cheetham (conductor), Michael Noone.
 El siglo de Oro: Spanish Sacred Music of the Renaissance London Cornett and Sackbut Ensemble, Pro Cantione Antiqua, dir. Bruno Turner.
 Medieval & Renaissance Gardens In Music Orlando Consort

References

External links
Biography in several languages

Renaissance composers
Spanish classical composers
Spanish male classical composers